Oliverian Brook is a  river in western New Hampshire in the United States. It is a tributary of the Connecticut River, which flows to Long Island Sound.

Oliverian Brook rises in the town of Benton, New Hampshire, on the western slopes of Mount Moosilauke on the northern outskirts of the village of Glencliff, at the juncture of Slide Brook and Still Brook. The brook flows south to near the center of Glencliff in the town of Warren before taking a sharp turn to the northwest and flowing through the center of Oliverian Notch, the westernmost of the major passes through the White Mountains.

The brook passes through a flood control reservoir known as Oliverian Pond before entering the town of Haverhill, where it passes through the villages of East Haverhill and Pike before reaching the Connecticut River near Haverhill village. New Hampshire Route 25 closely follows Oliverian Brook from Glencliff to NH 10 near the Connecticut River.

See also 

 List of New Hampshire rivers

References

Rivers of New Hampshire
Tributaries of the Connecticut River
Rivers of Grafton County, New Hampshire